Todd Traina is an American film producer and the founder of Red Rover Films in 2007. In 2007 Traina was named by Daily Variety as one of its "10 Producers to Watch." My Suicide, a quirky low-budget dark comedy released in 2009 which Traina produced, won a Crystal Bear at the 2009 Berlin Film Festival, among other prizes.

Traina was named to the board of the San Francisco Film Society in 2009.

Personal life 
Traina was born the son of shipping executive and art collector John Traina and Dede Wilsey, a San Francisco socialite. Traina's stepmother is the romance novelist Danielle Steel.

Film career 
Fresh from college, Traina began his career in the film industry in 1991 as a production assistant on television movie-of-the-week adaptations of his stepmother's novels. He turned independent producer two years later. His first complete film was Stanley's Gig, which he sold to the Starz Network and released in 2000.

Traina has compared being a producer to being a wedding planner and "the father of the bride in a wedding that lasts a whole year."

Films 
Traina has served as producer, co-producer or executive producer on the following films:
 Morning (2010) 
 The Romantics (2010) 
 Black Water Transit (2009)  
 Night Train (2009) 
 Blood and Bone (2009) 
 My Suicide (2009)) 
 Stag Night (2008) 
 Timber Falls (2007) 
 What We Do Is Secret (2007) 
 Punk's Not Dead (2007) 
 Grace Is Gone (2007)
 Skeleton Woman (2000)
 Stanley's Gig (2000) 
 Life Sold Separately (1997)

References

External links 
 Red Rover Films
 Todd Traina at Internet Movie Database
 Todd Traina's Facebook page
 2007 interview of Todd Traina on Keehn on Art radio show on 960, The Quake, discussing punk rock

Businesspeople from San Francisco
Connecticut College alumni
Living people
Film producers from California
1969 births